2014 ANFA Cup is a knock-out tournament organized by the All Nepal Football Association. All matches was played at the Dasarath Rangasala Stadium in Kathmandu. 8 teams participated in the tournament. Jhapa XI lifted the title after defeating Sankata Boys SC in the finals.

Participating teams

 APF Club
 Jhapa XI
 Manang Marshyangdi Club
 Morang XI
 Nepal Army Club
 Nepal Police Club
 Sankata Club
 Three Star Club

Knock-out stage

Matches

Quarter-final

Semi-final

Final

See also
ANFA Cup
ANFA League Cup

References 

ANFA Cup
ANFA Cup